The Delaware County Historical Museum Complex is an open-air museum of nine buildings located on the grounds of the former Lenox College in Hopkinton, Iowa. It is run by the Delaware County Historical Society and was established in 1959.

References

External links
 Delaware County Historical Society: Delaware County Historical Museum Complex

Museums in Delaware County, Iowa
History museums in Iowa
Open-air museums in Iowa
Museums established in 1959
1959 establishments in Iowa